U.S. Route 7 (US 7) in of Massachusetts is a  section of the larger federal route extending from southern Connecticut to the northernmost part of Vermont. Within Massachusetts, the entire route in Massachusetts is within Berkshire County.

Route description
With a few exceptions, US 7 is mainly a two-lane rural road winding through the Berkshires, largely parallel to the Housatonic River. In Great Barrington, US 7 is briefly concurrent with Route 41 along Main Street, as well as with Route 183 on State Road. Further north, US 7 is concurrent with Route 102 along Main Street through the center of Stockbridge.

While on this bypass route, it meets US 20, which travels southeast to Lee and the Massachusetts Turnpike. The two routes continue north via the bypass route, while Route 7A travels along Kemble and Main streets via the original routing of the road. The three routes meet just north of the Lenox census-designated place boundary, with US 7/US 20 merging back to a two-lane road until Pittsfield.

US 7 enters Pittsfield along South Street. At a signalized intersection with Housatonic Street, US 20 makes a left turn to continue west toward Albany. At Park Square, the route meets Route 9 near its western terminus, and the two routes share a two-block concurrency along East Street until US 7 makes a left turn to continue north.

US 7 leaves downtown Pittsfield as a two-lane surface arterial and continues as a rural highway with occasional three-lane stretches for climbing the grades along the Berkshires. It passes west of Mount Greylock before passing through Williamstown, connecting the Taconic Trail with the Mohawk Trail (Route 2). The road passes Williams College and crosses the Hoosic River one last time before entering Vermont.

History
Like Connecticut, Massachusetts planned an Interstate-grade freeway (proposed Interstate 89) in the US 7 corridor. The only portions of this plan to be completed were the short super-two freeway section from the Connecticut border to Sheffield, and the four-lane section south of Lenox, although land takings for additional freeway sections occurred. The highway was ultimately canceled due to environmental and community opposition.

Major intersections

See also

References

External links

 Massachusetts
07
Transportation in Berkshire County, Massachusetts